Sumapaz is the 20th locality of Bogotá, capital of Colombia. It is the largest of Bogotá's 20 localities, starting in the north at the edge of the urban frontier with Usme and stretching to the south at the border of Cundinamarca with the departments of Meta and Huila. It is completely rural, with no city services.

History 
The Sumapaz Páramo, covering most of the locality, was a sacred site for the indigenous Muisca in pre-Columbian times. In the 16th century, it was discovered by conquistadors led by Nicolaus Federmann in their quest for El Dorado.

It has been the stage for several rural conflicts, including those of 1928 and 1946. La Violencia of 1948 gave rise to the formation of the guerrilla groups still present in Colombia. At the beginning of the 21st century, the Colombian army took the territory from guerrilla hands as part of a counter-guerrilla strategy of president Álvaro Uribe.

Economy 
The population is dependent on small-scale farming and livestock.

General information

Borders 
 North: The locality of Usme
 East: The municipalities of Une and Gutiérrez and the department of Meta
 South: The department of Huila
 West: The municipalities of Cabrera, Venecia, San Bernardo, Arbeláez, and Pasca

Hydrology 
Within the borders of the locality, several rivers are formed, mostly within Sumapaz National Park. The two largest rivers are the Pilar and Sumapaz River, the latter flowing into the Magdalena River.

Points of interest 
 Sumapaz National Park
 Ecoparque Chinauta

References

External links 
  Video about Sumapaz
  National University of Colombia site about Sumapaz

Localities of Bogotá
Altiplano Cundiboyacense
Muisca Confederation
Muysccubun